Antibes (also ,) is a coastal city in the Alpes-Maritimes department of southeastern France, on the Côte d'Azur between Cannes and Nice.

The town of Juan-les-Pins is in the commune of Antibes and the Sophia Antipolis technology park is northwest of it.

History

Origins
Traces of occupation dating back to the early Iron Age have been found in the areas of the castle and cathedral. Remains beneath the Holy Spirit Chapel show there was an indigenous community with ties with Mediterranean populations, including the Etruscans, as evidenced by the presence of numerous underwater amphorae and wrecks off Antibes. However, most trade was with the Greek world, via the Phocaeans of Marseille.

Greek colony of Marseille

Antibes was founded as a Greek colony by Phocaeans from Massalia. They named it Antipolis (Greek: ,  "Opposite-City") from its position on the opposite side of the Var estuary from Nice.

Current research suggests that Antipolis was founded relatively late in classical Greek period (4th century BC), to benefit from the protection of Marseille with its trade routes along the coast and strongholds like Olbia at Hyères, and trading posts such as Antipolis itself and later Nikaia; it is mentioned by Strabo.

The exact location of the Greek city is not well known. Given Greek colonial practices, it is likely that it was set at the foot of the rock of Antibes, in today's old city. Traces of occupation in the Hellenistic period have been identified around the castle and the church (former cathedral). The goods unearthed during these excavations show the dominance of imported products of the Marseilles region, associated with Campanian and indigenous ceramics.

Early in the second century BC the Ligurian Deceates and Oxybiens tribes launched repeated attacks against Nikaia and Antipolis. The Greeks of Marseille appealed to Rome as they had already done a few years earlier against the federation of Salyens. In 154 BC the consul Quintus Opimius defeated the Décéates and Oxybiens and took Aegythna from the Décéates.

Roman Antipolis
Rome gradually increased its hold over the Mediterranean coast. In 43 BC, Antipolis was officially incorporated in the propraetorial (senatorial from 27 BC) province of Narbonesian Gaul, in which it remained for the next 500 years. Antipolis grew into the largest town in the region and a main entry point into Gaul. Roman artifacts such as aqueducts, fortified walls, and amphoræ can still be seen today.

Excavations in the old town have discovered well-preserved houses showing some luxury. Among them, the most monumental are those in the rectory garden of rue Clemenceau. These show a comparable level to that of the Gallo-Roman domus such as those of Saint-Romain-en-Gal. Large parts of the floor mosaic are organised around a courtyard with a marble fountain. The building dates from the late third century, although parts date from the end of the Hellenistic era or the end of the Roman Republic. Another house paved with porphyry and green stone was excavated between rue des Palmiers and the rue de la Blancherie. The finds at the Antibes Museum of Archaeology suggests the main occupation between the 2nd and 4th century. Finds from the end of the Hellenistic era and the end of the Roman Republic is present on both sites.

Aqueducts

The city was supplied with water by two aqueducts.
The Fontvieille aqueduct rises in Biot, and eventually joins the coast below the RN7 and the railway track at the Fort Carré. It was rediscovered and restored in the 18th century by the Chevalier d'Aguillon to supply the modern city.

The aqueduct called the Bouillide or Clausonnes rises near the town of Valbonne. Monumental remains of aqueduct bridges are located in the neighbourhood of Fugaret, in the forest of Valmasque and near the town of Vallauris.

Theatre and amphitheatre
Like most Roman towns, Antipolis possessed buildings for shows and entertainment. A Roman theatre is attested by the tombstone of the child "Septentrion". The inscription says "he danced and was popular on the stage of the theatre". The theatre was located, like the amphitheatre, between Rue de la République and Rue de Fersen, near the Porte Royale. The back wall is positioned substantially next to Rue Fourmillère. A radial wall was found on the right side of the bus station. A plan of the theatre made in the 16th century is in the Marciana National Library of Venice.

The remains of the amphitheatre were still visible at the end of the 17th century during the restructuring of the fortifications of the city. A concentric oval was still visible in many plans of the seventeenth century and in a map of Antibes from the early nineteenth century. These remains are now covered by the Fersen middle school.

Late Antiquity
The Bishopric of Antibes was established c.450 by Pope Leo I, the first two bishops being Armentarius and Agroecius. Shortly after the bishopric was established the Western Roman Empire collapsed, and by the end of the century the Antibes region had become part of the Kingdom of the Franks, which later grew into the Carolingian Empire. The Frankish empire provided three centuries of stability but then fell apart itself in the mid-ninth century, leading to a further period of upheaval.

Middle Ages
The dust eventually settled to leave Antibes within the territory of the County of Provence, itself part of the Kingdom of Burgundy-Arles and from 1033 the Holy Roman Empire. In the tenth century the coastal areas of Provence were menaced by 'Saracen' raiders from Muslim Spain, who were finally driven out when Count William I of Provence captured their stronghold at Fraxinetum in 975. William rewarded the knights who had fought for him in this campaign by enfeoffing them with the liberated lands in southern Provence. One of these knights was a certain Rodoald, who became Lord of Antibes.

Rodoald's great-grandson Raimbaud appears to have relocated inland to Grasse around 1050, and  sold the Lordship of Antibes to the bishopric during the episcopate of Bishop Bertrand (fl.1166-76).

During this period Antibes was still being raided periodically by Saracen pirates, and in 1124 they burned down Antibes Cathedral. The marauders continued to prey on the town over the following century, and in 1244 the Prince-Bishops of Antibes moved to Grasse to escape their depredations. They remained there for the next five centuries, despite an attempt to lure them back to Antibes by rebuilding the cathedral in 1250.

When the Western Schism began in 1378, splitting the Catholic world between two rival popes, the Bishop of Grasse backed Pope Urban VI even though Marie de Blois, mother of and regent to the infant Count Louis II of Provence, was a supporter of Urban's enemy Antipope Clement VII. In 1383 Marie therefore confiscated the Lordship of Antibes from the Bishops of Grasse and two years later awarded it to the brothers Marc and Luc Grimaldi, of the Genoese House of Grimaldi. The new Grimaldi lords built the Château Grimaldi as their residence in the town.

After the deaths of the Grimaldi brothers (Marc in 1398 and Luc in 1409), control of the Lordship of Antibes passed to five co-heirs. As a result of this fragmentation of power, the actions of individual local lords became increasingly irrelevant to the town's history, with the higher authority of the Count of Provence assuming greater significance instead.

Early Modern era

With the death in 1481 of Count Charles III, Provence was inherited by King Louis XI of France and thereby annexed to France. As Antibes was in the far southeast of the County of Provence it therefore became the border town at France's southeastern extremity, guarding the frontier with the County of Nice, which was part of the Savoyard state. As such it was on the front line during the Italian Wars waged by France against Emperor Charles V, and was sacked in 1536 by Andrea Doria, a Genoese admiral in imperial service. Henry II of France therefore ordered the construction of Fort Carré in 1550 to guard the town against any future attacks, and the citadel was later reinforced by the renowned French military engineer Vauban.

In December 1746, during the War of the Austrian Succession, an Austro-Savoyard army under the command of Maximilian Ulysses Browne invaded France and besieged Antibes, subjecting the town to a heavy bombardment. The arrival of French reinforcements, and a revolt against the Austrian garrison at Genoa, obliged Browne to lift the siege on 1 February 1747, but by that point his guns had levelled 350 houses and also destroyed the cathedral again. The latter was subsequently rebuilt by Louis XV of France, and this version of the building is the one that has survived to the present day.

Modern era

On March 1, 1815, Napoléon Bonaparte landed on the beach at Golfe-Juan, 5 km southwest of Antibes, having escaped exile on the island of Elba. He hoped for a warm welcome in Antibes, which had been supportive of his regime, but the townspeople closed their gates to him and he was therefore obliged to move on northward without stopping. He successfully reached Paris and seized power again, only to be conclusively defeated at the Battle of Waterloo. Today Golfe-Juan marks the beginning of the Route Napoléon, which traces the path taken by the emperor on his return from exile.

Under the Treaty of Turin (1860), Nice was ceded to France by the new Kingdom of Italy, and Antibes therefore ceased to be a border town as the frontier moved 50 km eastward to Menton.

From around the middle of the 19th century the Antibes area regained its popularity, as wealthy people from around Europe discovered its natural environment and built luxurious homes there. It was transferred from its former department of Var to the new one of Alpes Maritimes in 1860. The harbor was again used for a "considerable" fishing industry and the area exported dried fruit, salt fish, and oil.

By the First World War, it had been connected by rail with Nice and most of its fortifications had been demolished to make way for new residential districts. In 1926, the old Château Grimaldi was bought by the local municipality and later restored for use as a museum. Pablo Picasso came to the town in 1946, having visited his friend and fellow painter Gerald Murphy and his wife Sara there in 1923, and was invited to stay in the castle. During his six-month stay, Picasso painted and drew, as well as crafting ceramics and tapestries. When he departed, Picasso left a number of his works to the municipality. The castle has since become the Picasso Museum.

Culture

Conservation
On 25 May 1999, the town was the first in the départment to sign the State Environment Charter, which pledges to actively conserve the natural environment.

Sports
Sport is an important part of the local culture; the town hosts the National Training Centre for basketball. The now demolished Jean Bunoz Sports Hall hosted several games of the 1999 FIBA EuroBasket. The city is home to Olympique Antibes, a professional basketball team of France's top division LNB Pro A, which plays its home games at the Azur Arena Antibes.

The local football team is FC Antibes, who play at the Stade du Fort Carré, best known for when it hosted one game of the 1938 World Cup, between Sweden and Cuba.

The town is also home to the Antibes 6 Day Race and the Antibes Yacht Show.

Music
There is a jazz festival, Jazz à Juan, in July.

Population

Politics

Presidential elections second round

Sights

Beaches

Museums
 Archaeology Museum This museum sits atop the Promenade Amiral de Grasse in the old Bastion St Andre, a 17th-century fortress. The museum's collection focuses on the classical history of Antibes. Many artifacts, sculptures and amphorae found in local digs and shipwrecks from the harbour are displayed here.
 Naval Museum of Napoleon Housed in a 17th-century stone fort and tower, this museum presents a collection of Napoleonic memorabilia, paintings and naval models. Several wall paintings show historic moments in Napoleon's reign and there are also pieces of his clothing including one of the hats he wore.
 Picasso Museum This museum houses one of the world's greatest Picasso collections: 24 paintings, 44 drawings, 32 lithographs, 11 oils on paper, 80 pieces of ceramics, two sculptures and five tapestries.
 La Tour Museum This small museum in the centre of town brings the contemporary history of Antibes to life through its exhibit of costumes, tools, photographs and other objects used by the local people.
 Absinthe Museum The Absinthe Museum is located in a basement in the Roman foundations of Old Antibes. It is dedicated to the manufacture and appreciation of this green liqueur.

Parks and gardens
 The Exflora Park The Exflora Park is a five-hectare garden open to the public. Next to the large olive grove, there are different styles of Mediterranean gardens, from ancient Rome to the exuberant Riviera of the 19th century. Antibes is renowned for rose production, and rose bushes line the path leading to the sea. The exotic garden and palm grove is reminiscent of the belle époque, when English gardeners succeeded in planting flowers that bloom in winter, the season when the aristocracy visited the Côte d'Azur.
 A little further on is the Théâtre de Verdure, inspired by Italian gardens, and a panoramic viewpoint with a view of the sea and the Iles des Lerins. In the style of Provençal gardens of the 18th century, there is a maze with sculpted hedges. Further on, Islamic gardens are featured, with an orange grove where the ground is patterned with terracotta irrigation pipes similar to those in the celebrated Seville Cathedral in Spain. The vegetable gardens and orchards in the Arsat are planted in hollows as in Morocco to protect them from the sun and maximise shadow and humidity. A representation of a Moroccan house pays homage to the painter Majorelle, creator of the blue garden in Marrakesh. In another area, the winter garden contains plants that flower in winter, such as mimosa and camellias.
 The Eilenroc Gardens Villa Eilenroc was built on a rock in the middle of a virtual desert. The area was transformed into a garden through the patience and talent of Jacques Greber, landscape architect and consultant to the Great Exhibition in New York City in 1939.
 The gardens lie thirty metres above the sea with a view across the bay of the Cap. Planted with traditional Mediterranean species such as marine and parasol pines, Alep and Canary pines, cypress, oaks, olive trees, arbutus, lavender, thyme, rosemary, eucalyptus, ficus etc., as well as three kilometres of pittosporum hedges, a whole part of the park has been created with plants found in the Antibes area in 1920.
 Thuret Park In 1857, Gustave Thuret discovered the Cap d'Antibes and bought five hectares of land where he built a villa and began the creation of a park. Bequeathed to the state by his heirs, the Jardin botanique de la Villa Thuret is now managed by the INRA (National Institute of Agronomic Research). The collection of trees and exotic plants, and the rich earth, provide many opportunities for learning, and the cross-fertilisation of plant species that grow on the Mediterranean coast.
 Marineland In 1970, Roland de la Poype created this animal exhibition park in Antibes. First, it was a small oceanarium with a few pools and animals, but now it is one of the biggest in the world and receives more than 1,200,000 visitors per year. It is the only French sea park featuring two cetacean species: killer whales and dolphins.

Garoupe Lighthouse

The old lighthouse of Antibes provides views from its lofty hilltop. To get here, you must walk about one kilometre up the Chemin de Calvaire from the Plage de la Salis. It makes for a nice half-day stroll.

Church of the Immaculate Conception (Antibes Cathedral)

The cathedral in Antibes was first built by Bishop Armentarius in the fifth century. It was destroyed multiple times during its history, notably by Saracen pirates in 1124 and by Austrian bombardment during the 1746-7 Siege of Antibes. Its current façade dates to the rebuilding that followed the latter catastrophe, and blends Latin classical symmetry and religious fantasy. The interior houses some impressive pieces such as a Baroque altarpiece and life-sized wooden carving of Christ's death from 1447.

Hôtel du Cap-Eden Roc
This villa, set in "a forest" at the tip of the Cap d'Antibes peninsula, re-creates a nineteenth-century château. Since 1870 the glamorous white-walled Hotel du Cap on the French Riviera has been one of the most storied and luxurious resorts in the world. Guests who flocked there included Marlene Dietrich, the Duke and Duchess of Windsor and Winston Churchill. Elizabeth Taylor and Richard Burton conducted an affair and honeymooned there.

Ports

There are many yachting harbours which provide moorings for a range of ships ranging from fishing vessels to full sized yachts.

 Port Vauban: The largest yachting harbour in Europe, with more than 2,000 moorings, can accommodate craft of more than 100 metres. This old port was the heart of the ancient Greek city of Antipolis and has a long and colourful history which includes Ligurians, Romans and Crusaders on their way to the Holy Land. Today, it is the largest marina in Europe, serving both local fishing boats and luxury yachts.
 Port Galice: 542 moorings
 Port de la Salis: 233 moorings
 Port du Croûton: 390 moorings
 Port de l'Olivette: Situated in the sheltered cove of the same name, this is a harbour for sailors and their wooden fishing boats who enjoy the old marine, provencal traditions.

Theatre and music
The Théâtre Antibea, Théâtre des Heures Bleues and Café Théâtre la Scène sur Mer all offer a variety of performances from orchestra music to dramatic plays. Music of all types, from live jazz to DJs spinning techno, can be found in the bars and nightclubs and there are a number of festivals and special outdoor concerts during the summer. Jazz is still the speciality around here, and the Juan les Pins Jazz Festival is one of the best in the world.

M83 (an electronic band) hails from Antibes.

Festivals

Antibes and Juan les Pins host a number of festivals, mainly during the summer months. There's not much in the way of traditional cultural festivals in Antibes; most of the festivals focus on music and contemporary activities.
 Jazz à Juan remains one of the top jazz festivals in the world. Since its inception in 1960, it has attracted many jazz artists each year to play outdoors. (July).
 Antibes Yacht Show
 The Antique Show of Antibes attracts thousands of collectors for two weeks in April. It's one of the largest shows of its kind in France (April).
 Voiles d'Antibes is one of the world's biggest gatherings of old teak and brass sailing vessels. They converge on the port for one of the most regal regattas in the Mediterranean (June).
 The Festival of Saint Peter is the annual celebration of the patron saint of fishermen. A colourful procession through the town is followed by all the local fishermen adorning their boats and floating along the coast (June).
 The Festival of Notre Dame de Bon Port begins on the first Thursday of July and continues to the following Sunday, celebrating Notre Dame de Bon Port, the local manifestation of the Virgin Mary. At sunrise on the Thursday a mass is held in the chapel next to the Garoupe lighthouse and fishermen dressed in traditional sailors' outfits subsequently carry the statue of Notre Dame de Bon Port from the chapel (where it resides for most of the year) down the Chemin de Calvaire to Antibes Cathedral at the head of a large procession. The statue remains in the cathedral for the remaining four days of the festival, which includes multiple masses, a torchlit procession through the town on the Saturday evening, and parties at which pissaladière is traditionally eaten.
 The Festival of Sacred Music takes place in Antibes Cathedral, which has renowned acoustics. Sacred music is the theme of this popular festival, which attracts huge crowds each year (January).

Climate
Antibes enjoys a Mediterranean climate.

Shopping
 Marché Provençal

Transport
The Antibes station is the railway station serving the town, offering connections to Nice, Cannes, Marseille, Grasse, St Raphael, Les Arcs, Milan, Ventimiliga, Paris and several other destinations. This railway station is in the centre of town. There is another railway station, Juan-les-Pins. The nearest airports are Nice Côte d'Azur Airport and Cannes Airport.

Notable people

Born in Antibes 

Honoré Tournély (1658–1729), Catholic theologian, a Gallican opponent of Jansenism.
Charles Claude Ange Monneron (1735–1799), a businessman, banker and politician.
André Masséna (1758–1817), Napoleonic general and Marshal of the Empire.
Honoré Vial (1766–1813), military leader and diplomat in the French Revolutionary Wars.
Honoré Charles Reille (1775–1860), Marshal of France.
Ignazio Dracopoli (1887–1923), Anglo–French cartographer and explorer
Jacques Audiberti (1899–1965), playwright, poet and novelist, Theatre of the Absurd.
Marie-Louise Meilland (1920–1987), a French rose breeder
Judith Miller (1941–2017), a French psychoanalyst and philosopher
Halima Soussi (born 1965), basketball player
Christophe Gans (born 1961), film director, producer and screenwriter
Guillaume Musso (born 1974), a French novelist
Laurent Gagnier (born 1979), former footballer with over 250 club caps.
Luc-Arthur Vebobe (born 1980), basketball player
Coline-Marie Orliac (born 1989), a harpist 
M83, electronic group formed in Antibes in 1999

Lived in Antibes 

Pablo Picasso (1881–1973), Spanish painter
Nikos Kazantzakis (1883–1957), writer of Zorba the Greek, owned a villa in Old Town
Gerald and Sara Murphy (1888–1964) & (1883–1975), wealthy expatriate Americans credited with establishing the French Riviera as a summer resort
Duke of Windsor (1894-1972), former King Edward VIII 
Graham Greene (1904–1991), lived in a small apartment in Antibes in his later years
Mike Cumberlege (1905–1945), Royal Navy officer
Aristotle Onassis (1906–1975), a Greek shipping magnate 
Stavros Niarchos (1909–1996), a Greek billionaire shipping tycoon. 
Gloria Guinness (1912–1980), a Mexican socialite and fashion and cultural icon
Ruth Madoff (born 1941), wife of Bernie Madoff

Died in Antibes 

Jean-Étienne Championnet (1762–1800), soldier in the French Revolutionary Wars.
Henry Wrenfordsley (1825–1908), Irish lawyer, judge in Australia and the Leeward Islands
Nicholas I of Montenegro (1841–1921), prince and king of Montenegro
Paul Arène (1843–1896), a Provençal poet and French writer.
George Sandys (1875–1937), diplomat and Conservative politician.
Charlotte Ives (1886–1976), American silent film actress, lived in Antibes in her later years
Gabriel Guevrekian (1892-1970), an Armenian architect
Paul Gallico (1897–1976), American writer, lived his final years in Antibes
Robert Deloche (1909–1988), furrier, militant communist and mayor of Joinville-le-Pont.
Claude Autant-Lara (1901–2000), film director and later Member of the European Parliament.
Nicolas de Staël (1914–1955), a French painter of Russian origin 
Georgette Cottin-Euziol (1926-2004), French Algerian architect
Jean Cottard (1926–2020), a French foil fencer

Twin towns – sister cities

Antibes is twinned with:

 Aalborg, Denmark
 Desenzano del Garda, Italy
 Eilat, Israel
 Kinsale, Ireland
 Krasnogorsk, Russia
 Newport Beach, United States
 Olympia, Greece
 Schwäbisch Gmünd, Germany

See also
 Communes of the Alpes-Maritimes department
 Route Napoléon
 Stade du Fort Carré
 Tour Grimaldi

Notes

References

External links

 
 Antibes official website

 
Archaeological sites in France
Communes of Alpes-Maritimes
French Riviera
Massalian colonies
Populated places established in the 6th century BC
Roman towns and cities in Provence
Vauban fortifications in France